The Penitentiary Act (19 Geo. III, c.74) was a British Act of Parliament passed in 1779 which introduced a policy of state prisons for the first time. The Act was drafted by the prison reformer John Howard and the jurist William Blackstone and recommended imprisonment as an alternative sentence to death or transportation.

The prison population in England and Wales had swollen following the initial fighting in the American Rebellion and the government's attendant decision, by the Criminal Law Act 1776 (16 Geo. 3 c.43), to temporarily halt use of the American Colonies as the standard destination for transported criminals. As early as 1777, Howard had produced a report to a House of Commons select committee which identified appalling conditions in most of the prisons he had inspected.

While the purpose of the Act had been to create a network of state-operated prisons, and despite its passage through Parliament, the act resulted only in considerable study of methods, alternatives and possible locations; no prisons would be built as a direct result of the act, although the prison network and alternatives would be created over time.

References

Great Britain Acts of Parliament 1779
Penal system in the United Kingdom